The Goldsmith Book Prize is a literary award for books published in the United States.

Description
The award is meant to recognize works that "[improve] government through an examination of the intersection between press, politics, and public policy." The prize is awarded to the book published in the previous year that best exemplifies the fulfillment of this goal. The first such prize was awarded in 1993. The program was expanded in 2002 to include two separate book prizes, for trade and academic works.

The Goldsmith Awards Program, launched in 1991, is based at the Shorenstein Center on Media, Politics and Public Policy at the John F. Kennedy School of Government, a part of Harvard University. The center also gives out the Goldsmith Prize for Investigative Reporting, and the Goldsmith Career Award for Excellence in Journalism.

Book Prize winners
2020
No award given

2019
Academic: Matthew Hindman, The Internet Trap: How the Digital Economy Builds Monopolies and Undermines DemocracyMargaret E. Roberts, Censored: Distraction and Diversion Inside China’s Great Firewall  
Trade: Steven Levitsky and Daniel Ziblatt, How Democracies Die

 2018
No award given

 2017  
Academic: James T. Hamilton, Democracy’s Detectives: The Economics of Investigative Journalism  
Trade: David Greenberg, Republic of Spin: An Inside History of the American Presidency

 2016   
Academic: Erik Albæk, Arjen van Dalen, Nael Jebril and Claes H. de Vreese, Political Journalism in Comparative Perspective  
Trade: Harold Holzer, Lincoln and the Power of the Press: The War for Public Opinion

 2015   
Academic: Daniela Stockmann, Media Commercialization and Authoritarian Rule in China  
Trade: Andrew Pettegree, The Invention of News: How the World Came to Know about Itself

 2014
Academic: Kevin Arceneaux and Martin Johnson, Changing Minds or Changing Channels? Partisan News in an Age of Choice
Matthew Levendusky, How Partisan Media Polarize America
Trade: Jaron Lanier, Who Owns the Future?

 2013
Academic: Jonathan M. Ladd, Why Americans Hate the Media and How It Matters
Trade: Rebecca MacKinnon, Consent of the Networked: The Worldwide Struggle for Internet Freedom

 2012
Academic: Jeffrey E. Cohen, Going Local: Presidential Leadership in the Post-Broadcast Age 
Trade: Evgeny Morozov, The Net Delusion: The Dark Side of Internet Freedom

 2011
Academic: Tim Groeling, When Politicians Attack: Party Cohesion in the Media
Patrick J. Sellers, Cycles of Spin: Strategic Communication in the U.S. Congress
Trade: Jack Fuller, What Is Happening to the News: The Information Explosion and the Crisis in Journalism

 2010
Academic: Matthew Hindman, The Myth of Digital Democracy
Trade: John Maxwell Hamilton, Journalism's Roving Eye: A History of American Foreign Reporting

2009
Academic: Markus Prior, Post-Broadcast Democracy: How Media Choice Increases Inequality in Political Involvement and Polarizes Elections.
Trade: Jane Mayer, The Dark Side: The Inside Story of How the War on Terror Turned into a War on American Ideals

2008
Academic: John G. Geer, In Defense of Negativity: Attack Ads in Presidential Campaigns
Trade: Ted Gup, Nation of Secrets: The Threat to Democracy and the American Way of Life

2007
Academic: Diana C. Mutz, Hearing the Other Side: Deliberative versus Participatory Democracy
Trade: Gene Roberts and Hank Klibanoff, The Race Beat: The Press, the Civil Rights Struggle and the Awakening of a Nation

2006
Academic: James A. Stimson, Tides of Consent: How Public Opinion Shapes American Politics
Trade: Geoffrey R. Stone, Perilous Times: Free Speech in Wartime from the Sedition Act of 1798 to the War on Terrorism

2005
Academic: Daniel C. Hallin and Paolo Mancini, Comparing Media Systems: Three Models of Media and Politics
Trade: Paul Starr, The Creation of the Media: Political Origins of Modern Communications

2004
Academic: Scott L. Althaus, Collective Preferences in Democratic Politics: Opinion Surveys and the Will of the People
Paul M. Kellstedt, The Mass Media and the Dynamics of American Racial Attitudes
Trade: Bill Katovsky and Timothy Carlson, Embedded: The Media at War in Iraq 

2003
Academic: Doris Graber, Processing Politics: Learning from Television in the Internet Age
Trade: Leonard Downie, Jr. and Robert G. Kaiser, The News About the News: American Journalism in Peril 

2002
Academic: Robert M. Entman and Andrew Rojecki, The Black Image in the White Mind 
Trade: Bill Kovach and Tom Rosenstiel, The Elements of Journalism 

2001
Lawrence R. Jacobs & Robert Y. Shapiro, Politicians Don't Pander: Political Manipulation and the Loss of Democratic Responsiveness

2000
Robert McChesney, Rich Media, Poor Democracy 

1999
James Hamilton, Channeling Violence: The Economic Market for Violent Television Programming

1998
Richard Norton Smith, The Colonel: The Life and Legend of Robert R. McCormick, 1880-1955

1997
No award given

1996
Stephen Ansolabehere and Shanto Iyengar, Going Negative: How Political Advertisements Shrink and Polarize the Electorate

1995
William Hoynes, Public Television for Sale: Media, the Market and the Public Sphere

1994
Cass R. Sunstein, Democracy and the Problem of Free Speech

1993
Greg Mitchell, Campaign of the Century: Upton Sinclair's Race for Governor of California and the Birth of Media Politics

See also
List of American literary awards
List of literary awards

References

External links
Shorenstein Center on Media, Politics and Public Policy's official Web site

Awards established in 1993
Harvard University
American non-fiction literary awards
Awards by university and college in the United States